Sergey Mihaylov (born March 5, 1976) is an Uzbek boxer, who competed in the light heavyweight (81 kg) division at the 2000 Summer Olympics and won the bronze medal.

Career
He won the Asian light heavy title in 1998.

Olympic Results 2000
Defeated Claudiu Rasco (Romania) 15-6
Defeated Ali Ismailov (Azerbaijan) 23-18
Defeated Olzhas Orazaliev (Kazakhstan) RSC 4
Lost to Alexander Lebziak (Russia) RSC 1

He went up to 201 lbs and won the Asian title in 2002.

At the 2003 world championships he lost in the quarterfinals (30:35) to Steffen Kretschmann.

External links
 Asian Games 1998
 Asian Games 2002
 

1976 births
Living people
Uzbekistani male boxers
Olympic boxers of Uzbekistan
Olympic bronze medalists for Uzbekistan
Olympic medalists in boxing
Boxers at the 2000 Summer Olympics
Medalists at the 2000 Summer Olympics
Asian Games medalists in boxing
Asian Games gold medalists for Uzbekistan
Boxers at the 1998 Asian Games
Boxers at the 2002 Asian Games
Medalists at the 1998 Asian Games
Medalists at the 2002 Asian Games
Light-heavyweight boxers